Agasalim Atakishiyev (born 1900 - died 1970) was an Azerbaijani politician. He was  Interior Minister of Azerbaijan Soviet Socialist Republic since 10 June 1934 - 6 June 1953. Atakishiyev has been one of the supporters of formation Azerbaijan People's Government in Iran.

Iranian Azerbaijan
Atakishiyev was head of the special operations in "Aliyev's mission", which was a group of 2500 persons sent to Iranian Azerbaijan, Tabriz, to build the Pishevari government .

Notes

References
 Azərbaycan SSR-in partiya və məhkəmə-istintaq orqanlarının rəhbərliyi kütləvi repressiyalara hazırlıq dövründə (1933-1936-cı illər)
 Ağasəlim Atakişiyev isə 10 il (10.07.1943 – 06.06.1953) daxili işlər naziri olub
 

Politicians from Baku
Interior Ministers of Azerbaijan
Government ministers of Azerbaijan
1900 births
1986 deaths
Azerbaijani generals